David Dempsey may refer to:

 David Dempsey (cricketer) (born 1955), New Zealand cricketer
 David Dempsey (hurler) (born 1995), Irish hurler
 David Dempsey (writer) (1914–1999), American writer